is a passenger railway station in located in the city of Hikone,  Shiga Prefecture, Japan, operated by the private railway operator Ohmi Railway.

Lines
Toriimoto Station is served by the Ohmi Railway Main Line, and is located 3.4 rail kilometers from the terminus of the line at Maibara Station.

Station layout
The station consists of a single island platform connected to the station building by a level crossing. The station building is unattended.

Platform

Adjacent stations

History
Torimoto Station was opened on March 15, 1931. The station building received protection as a Registered Tangible Cultural Property in 2013.

Passenger statistics
In fiscal 2019, the station was used by an average of 103 passengers daily (boarding passengers only).

Surrounding area
Hikone City Hall Toriimoto Branch Office
Hikone City Toriimoto Junior High School
Hikone City Toriimoto Elementary School
Shiga Prefectural Toriimoto School for the Disabled

See also
List of railway stations in Japan

References

External links

  Ohmi Railway official site

Railway stations in Shiga Prefecture
Railway stations in Japan opened in 1931
Hikone, Shiga
Registered Tangible Cultural Properties